Pambaram, also called the Buguri, Lattu, Bongaram, and Latim is a traditional throwing top used mainly in India and Bangladesh.

Components  
 Wooden body 
 Nail tip
 String (wrapped around the crown of the top, allowing the player to spin the top as it is thrown)

Game play
The game begins with all players holding their wound top.

The players throw their tops at the same time – this is the "toss" for the game. The "toss" is decided by the top spun and picked up quickest.

The throw is triggered by a simple countdown – at the count of 1, 2, 3 all the players wind their pambarams, unwind it on the ground to rotate and then pick it up with the rope as quickly as possible. The primary skill is to use the shortest rope length usage and still make the bambaram spin, so it can be caught with the rope.

Pambarams that did not complete the toss are placed in the center of a circle. The players who finished the toss successfully try to spin the top over the tops in the circle trying to break (gunna in Karnataka slang) them and/or trying to knock them out of the circle. Each time the spinning tops have to be picked up successfully to continue.

See also
Gasing pangkah

References

Traditional sports of Pakistan
Traditional sports of India
Tops